Betim Fazliji (born 25 April 1999) is a Kosovan professional footballer who plays as a centre-back for 2. Bundesliga club St. Pauli and the Kosovo national team.

Club career

St. Gallen
On 21 June 2019, Fazliji signed his first professional contract with Swiss Super League side St. Gallen after agreeing to a two-year deal. His debut with St. Gallen came on 27 July in a 1–2 away win against Basel after being named in the starting line-up.

St. Pauli
On 15 June 2022, Fazliji joined 2. Bundesliga side St. Pauli. His debut with St. Pauli came a day later in a 3–2 home win against 1. FC Nürnberg after coming on as a substitute at last minutes in place of Adam Dźwigała.

International career

Switzerland

In September 2019, Fazliji becomes part of Switzerland U20 with which he made his debut in a 2–2 away draw against Portugal U20 after coming on as a substitute in the 78th minute in place of Yannick Marchand. On 2 October 2020, he received a call-up from Switzerland U21 for 2021 UEFA European Under-21 Championship qualification matches against Georgia U21 and Liechtenstein U21, but Fazliji refused to join the team after he was in process of completing the necessary documents, which would allow him to play for Kosovo in November 2020 matches.

Kosovo
On 28 September 2020, Fazliji confirmed through an interview that he has started the process of completing the necessary documents which if completed in time, Fazliji would be ready to join with Kosovo national team in the next 2020–21 UEFA Nations League matches in November 2020. On 3 November 2020, he received a call-up from Kosovo for the friendly match against Albania and 2020–21 UEFA Nations League matches against Slovenia and Moldova. Eight days later, Fazliji made his debut with Kosovo in a friendly match against Albania after being named in the starting line-up.

Personal life
Fazliji was born in Vranje, FR Yugoslavia to Albanian parents from the village Miratovac of Preševo, and he is the second player of Kosovo that comes from the Preševo Valley after Gjelbrim Taipi.

Career statistics

References

External links

Betim Fazliji at FC St. Gallen

1999 births
Living people
People from Vranje
Kosovan footballers
Kosovo international footballers
Swiss men's footballers
Switzerland youth international footballers
Swiss people of Kosovan descent
Swiss people of Albanian descent
Association football central defenders
Swiss Super League players
FC St. Gallen players
2. Bundesliga players
FC St. Pauli players